Nesarabad (Swarupkathi) is an upazila of Pirojpur District in the Division of Barisal, Bangladesh. Nesarabad is named after Nesaruddin Ahmad, the founder of Sarsina Darbar Sharif. At present, guava gardens, floating market and backwaters of Nesarabad are turning into famous tourist attractions.

Geography 
It has 40,792 households and a total area of 199.14 km2.

Demographics 
According to the 1991 Bangladesh census, Nesarabad had a population of 202,520. Males constituted 49.54% of the population, and females 50.46%. The population aged 18 or over was 107,488. Nesarabad had an average literacy rate of 50.8% (7+ years), compared to the national average of 32.4%.

Nesarabad Upazila is divided into Swarupkati Municipality and ten union parishads: Atghar Kuriana, Baldia, Daihari, Guarekha, Jalabari, Nesarabad, Sarengkathi, Sohagdal, Somudoykathi, and Sutiakathi. The union parishads are subdivided into 80 mauzas and 134 villages.

Swarupkati Municipality is subdivided into 9 wards and 9 mahallas.

Notable people
 Nesaruddin Ahmad, Islamic scholar and first Pir of Sarsina
Abu Zafar Mohammad Saleh, the 2nd Pir of Sarsina Darbar Sharif
Enayet Hossain Khan, former MP
Fakhrul Islam Khan, playwright and journalist
Hashem Ali Khan, politician
Shah Alam, former MP
Sheikh Anne Rahman, politician
Chittaranjan Sutar, former parliamentarian

See also 
Upazilas of Bangladesh
Districts of Bangladesh
Divisions of Bangladesh

References 

 
Upazilas of Pirojpur District